James Douglas Annan is a scientist involved in climate prediction. He was a member of the Global Warming Research Program at Frontier Research Centre for Global Change which is associated with the Earth Simulator in Japan.  In 2014 he left Japan, returning to the United Kingdom as a co-founder of Blue Skies Research.

Education
Annan was awarded a DPhil degree in graph theory by the Mathematical and Physical Sciences Division of the University of Oxford in 1994. His doctoral thesis was entitled The complexity of counting problems.

Climatology
Annan has made several bets against those who believe the scientific consensus on climate change to be incorrect. The November 10, 2004 online version of Reason magazine reported that Lindzen is "willing to take bets that global average temperatures in 20 years will in fact be lower than they are now." Annan contacted Lindzen to arrange a bet and they exchanged proposals for bets, but were unable to agree on terms.  The final proposal was a bet that if the temperature change were less than 0.2 °C (0.36 °F), Lindzen would win. If the temperature change were between 0.2 °C and 0.4 °C the bet would be off, and if the temperature change were 0.4 °C or greater, Annan would win. Lindzen would take 20 to 1 odds.

In 2005, another bet for $10,000 dollars was arranged with a pair of Russian solar physicists Galina Mashnich and Vladimir Bashkirtsev.  The bet ended in 2017 with a win to Annan. Mashnich and Bashkirtsev did not honour the bet.

A third bet in 2007 between Annan and David Whitehouse of the Global Warming Policy Foundation was arranged by the BBC Radio program, More or Less in 2007.  Annan and Whitehouse bet £100 on whether the Met Office temperature would set a new annual record by the end of 2011.  Annan was declared to have lost in the program in January 2012.

He considers that climate sensitivity uncertainty is less than has often been portrayed. Papers on this include "Using multiple observationally-based constraints to estimate climate sensitivity".

References

External links
Climate scientists issue dire warning
Climate change sceptics bet $10,000 on cooler world
James Annan's blog
James Annan's former homepage at Japan Agency for Marine-Earth Science and Technology (JAMSTEC)

Year of birth missing (living people)
Living people
Alumni of the University of Oxford
British climatologists
Intergovernmental Panel on Climate Change contributing authors